The Antimafia Pool was a group of investigating magistrates at the Prosecuting Office of Palermo (Sicily) who closely worked together sharing information and developing new investigative and prosecutorial strategies against the Sicilian Mafia. An informal pool had been created by Judge Rocco Chinnici in the early 1980s following the example of anti-terrorism judges in Northern Italy in the 1970s.

Most important, they assumed collective responsibility for carrying Mafia prosecutions forward: all the members of the pool signed prosecutorial orders to avoid exposing any one of them to particular risk, such as the one that had cost Judge Gaetano Costa his life. Costa had signed the indictments of 55 against the Mafia heroin-trafficking network of the Spatola-Inzerillo-Gambino clan after virtually all of the other prosecutors in his office had declined to do so – a fact that leaked out of the office and eventually cost him his life. He was murdered on 6 August 1980, on the orders of Salvatore Inzerillo.

In July 1983, Rocco Chinnici was killed by the Mafia. His place as head of the ‘Office of Instruction’ (Ufficio istruzione), the investigative branch of the Prosecution Office of Palermo, was taken by Antonino Caponnetto, who formalized the pool. Next to Giovanni Falcone, the group included Paolo Borsellino, Giuseppe Di Lello and Leonardo Guarnotta. 

The group subsequently pooled together several investigations into the Mafia, which would result in the Maxi Trial against the Mafia starting in February 1986 and which lasted until December 1987. The trial was held in a bunker-courthouse specially constructed for this purpose inside the walls of the Ucciardone prison in Palermo. A total of 475 mafiosi were indicted for a multitude of crimes relating to Mafia activities, based primarily on testimonies given as evidence from former Mafia bosses turned informants, known as pentiti, in particular Tommaso Buscetta and Salvatore Contorno. Most were convicted and, to the surprise of many, the convictions were upheld several years later in January 1992, after the final stage of appeal. The importance of the trial was that the existence of Cosa Nostra was finally judicially confirmed.

References

Bibliography
Jamieson, Alison (2000). The Antimafia: Italy’s fight against organized crime, London: Macmillan, . 
Schneider, Jane T. & Peter T. Schneider (2003). Reversible Destiny: Mafia, Antimafia, and the Struggle for Palermo, Berkeley: University of California Press 
Stille, Alexander (1995). Excellent Cadavers: The Mafia and the Death of the First Italian Republic, New York: Vintage

Further reading
Dickie, John (2004). Cosa Nostra. A history of the Sicilian Mafia, London: Coronet,  (Review in the Observer, February 15, 2004)

History of the Sicilian Mafia
Mafia trials
Organized crime events in Italy
History of Palermo
Antimafia